Split is a 2016 South Korean film directed by Choi Kook-hee. It stars Yoo Ji-tae, Lee Jung-hyun, Lee David and Jung Sung-hwa.

Plot
A man once considered a bowling legend teams up with an autistic genius bowling player and a bookmaker.

Cast
 Yoo Ji-tae as Yoon Cheol-jong
 Lee Jung-hyun as Joo Hee-jin
 Lee David as Park Young-hoon
 Jung Sung-hwa as 'Toad' Doo Joong-oh
 Kwon Hae-hyo as President Baek 
 Moon Young-soo as Grey-haired man
 Jang Hee-woong as Moo-kyung 
 Kim Hye-na as Ms. Yoon 
 Yang Dong-tak as Hunting cap
 Park Chul-min as Park Yoon-bae

Awards and nominations

References

External links
 
 
 

2016 films
2010s Korean-language films
South Korean sports drama films
Films about gambling
Ten-pin bowling films
2010s sports drama films
Films directed by Choi Kook-hee
Films about autism
2016 drama films
2010s South Korean films